Niesułowice  is a village in the administrative district of Gmina Olkusz, within Olkusz County, Lesser Poland Voivodeship, in southern Poland.

Religions
 Roman Catholicism,
 Jehovah's Witnesses (10%).

References

Villages in Olkusz County